The 2012 Varsity Cup was contested from 6 February to 9 April 2012. The tournament (also known as the FNB Varsity Cup presented by Steinhoff International for sponsorship reasons) was the fifth season of the Varsity Cup, an annual inter-university rugby union competition featuring eight South African universities.

Scoring
All four 2012 Varsity Rugby competitions will use a different scoring system to the regular system. Tries will be worth five points as usual, but conversions will be worth three points, while penalties and drop goals will only be worth two points.

Varsity Cup

Competition Rules
There are eight participating universities in the 2012 Varsity Cup. These teams will play each other once over the course of the season, either home or away.

Teams receive four points for a win and two points for a draw. Bonus points are awarded to teams that score four or more tries in a game, as well as to teams that lose a match by seven points or less. Teams are ranked by log points, then points difference (points scored less points conceded).

The top four teams will qualify for the title play-offs. In the semi-finals, the team that finishes first will have home advantage against the team that finishes fourth, while the team that finishes second will have home advantage against the team that finishes third. The winners of these semi-finals will play each other in the final, at the home venue of the higher-placed team.

The team that finishes eighth in the Varsity Cup will be relegated to the 2013 Varsity Shield. The team that finishes seventh in the Varsity Cup will play a promotion/relegation match against the second-placed Varsity Shield team for a place in the 2013 Varsity Cup.

Teams

The following teams took part in the 2012 Varsity Cup competition:

Standings

Fixtures and results
 Fixtures are subject to change.
 All times are South African (GMT+2).

Regular season

Round one

Round two

Round three

Round four

Round Five

Round Six

Round Seven

Play-off games

Semi-finals

Final

Honours

Varsity Shield

Competition Rules
There are five participating universities in the 2012 Varsity Shield. These teams will play each other twice over the course of the season, once at home and once away.

Teams receive four points for a win and two points for a draw. Bonus points are awarded to teams that score four or more tries in a game, as well as to teams that lose a match by seven points or less. Teams are ranked by log points, then points difference (points scored less points conceded).

The top two teams will qualify for the title play-offs. The team that finishes first will have home advantage against the team that finishes second.

The team that wins the Varsity Shield will be promoted to the 2013 Varsity Cup.

The team that loses in the play-off final will play a promotion/relegation match against the seventh placed Varsity Cup team for a place in the 2013 Varsity Cup.

The team that finishes bottom might also be challenged to play in a play-off.

Participating teams

Standings

Fixtures and results
 Fixtures are subject to change.
 All times are South African (GMT+2).

Regular season

Round one

Round two

Round three

Round four

Round Five

Round Six

Round Seven

Round Eight

Round Nine

Round Ten

Play-off games

Final

Squads
The following players made at least one matchday squad during the season:

Honours

Promotion/relegation
  was promoted to the 2013 Varsity Cup.
  was relegated to the 2013 Varsity Shield.
  beat  in a promotion/relegation game and will play in the 2013 Varsity Cup, while  will play in the 2013 Varsity Shield.
  beat  in a promotion/relegation game and will play in the 2013 Varsity Shield.

Promotion/relegation play-off

2013 Varsity Cup play-off

2013 Varsity Shield play-off

Young Guns

Competition Rules
There are eight participating universities in the 2012 Young Guns competition. These teams are divided into two pools (the FNB pool and the Steinhoff pool) and will play the other teams in the pool once over the course of the season, either home or away.

Teams receive four points for a win and two points for a draw. Bonus points are awarded to teams that score four or more tries in a game, as well as to teams that lose a match by seven points or less. Teams are ranked by log points, then points difference (points scored less points conceded).

The top two teams in each pool will qualify for the title play-offs. In the semi-finals, the teams that finish first will have home advantage against the teams that finish second in their respective pools. The winners of these semi-finals will play each other in the final.

Participating teams

Standings

Fixtures and results
 Fixtures are subject to change.
 All times are South African (GMT+2).

Regular season

Round one

Round two

Round three

Round Five

Round Six

Round Seven

Play-off games

Semi-finals

Final

Honours

Koshuis Rugby Championship

Competition Rules
There are eight participating teams in the 2012 Koshuis Rugby Championship - the winners of the internal leagues of each of the eight Varsity Cup teams. These teams are divided into two pools (the Penny Pinchers pool and the Hertz pool) and will play the other teams in the pool once over the course of the season, either home or away.

Teams receive four points for a win and two points for a draw. Bonus points are awarded to teams that score four or more tries in a game, as well as to teams that lose a match by seven points or less. Teams are ranked by log points, then points difference (points scored less points conceded).

The top two teams in each pool will qualify for the title play-offs. In the semi-finals, the teams that finish first will have home advantage against the teams that finish second in their respective pools. The winners of these semi-finals will play each other in the final.

Participating teams

Standings

Fixtures and results
 All times are South African (GMT+2).

Regular season

Round one

Round two

Round three

Round four

Round Five

Play-off games

Semi-finals

Final

Honours

See also
 Varsity Cup
 2012 Currie Cup Premier Division
 2012 Currie Cup First Division
 2012 Vodacom Cup

References

External links
 Official site

2012
2012 in South African rugby union